Several places are named Kumbhariya or Kumbharia in Gujarat, India.

 Kumbhariya, Surat district, a village in Surat district of Gujarat.
 Kumbharia, Kutch District, Gujarat or Kumbhariyu, a village near Anjar, Kutch district of Gujarat
 Kumbhariya, Banaskantha district, a village near Ambaji, Banaskantha district of Gujarat